The Marriage at Cana is a panel painting by Early Netherlandish painter Gerard David. It is in the collection of the Louvre.

References

Panel painting
Paintings by Gerard David
16th-century paintings
Paintings in the Louvre by Dutch, Flemish and German artists